Pap is a nickname of:

 Preston Pap Dean (1915–2011), American cartoonist
 Benjamin "Pap" Singleton (1809–1892), African-American civil rights activist, businessman, abolitionist and escaped slave
 George Henry Thomas (1816–1870), Union general during the American Civil War

Lists of people by nickname